Cancer research is research into cancer to identify causes and develop strategies for prevention, diagnosis, treatment, and cure.

Cancer research ranges from epidemiology, molecular bioscience to the performance of clinical trials to evaluate and compare applications of the various cancer treatments. These applications include surgery, radiation therapy, chemotherapy, hormone therapy, immunotherapy and combined treatment modalities such as chemo-radiotherapy. Starting in the mid-1990s, the emphasis in clinical cancer research shifted towards therapies derived from biotechnology research, such as cancer immunotherapy and gene therapy.

Cancer research is done in academia, research institutes, and corporate environments, and is largely government funded.

History 

Cancer research has been ongoing for centuries. Early research focused on the causes of cancer. Percivall Pott identified the first environmental trigger (chimney soot) for cancer in 1775 and cigarette smoking was identified as a cause of lung cancer in 1950. Early cancer treatment focused on improving surgical techniques for removing tumors. Radiation therapy took hold in the 1900s. Chemotherapeutics were developed and refined throughout the 20th century.

The U.S. declared a "War on Cancer" in the 1970s, and increased the funding and support for cancer research.

Seminal papers 
Some of the most highly cited and most influential research reports include:

The Hallmarks of Cancer, published in 2000, and Hallmarks of Cancer: The Next Generation, published in 2011, by Douglas Hanahan and Robert Weinberg. Together, these articles have been cited in over 30,000 published papers.

Types of research 
Cancer research encompasses a variety of types and interdisciplinary areas of research. Scientists involved in cancer research may be trained in areas such as chemistry, biochemistry, molecular biology, physiology, medical physics, epidemiology, and biomedical engineering. Research performed on a foundational level is referred to as basic research and is intended to clarify scientific principles and mechanisms. Translational research aims to elucidate mechanisms of cancer development and progression and transform basic scientific findings into concepts that can be applicable to the treatment and prevention of cancer. Clinical research is devoted to the development of pharmaceuticals, surgical procedures, and medical technologies for the eventual treatment of patients.

Prevention and epidemiology 

Epidemiologic analysis indicates that at least 35% of all cancer deaths in the world could now be avoided by primary prevention. According to a newer GBD systematic analysis, in 2019, ~44% of all cancer deaths – or ~4.5 M deaths or ~105 million lost disability-adjusted life years – were due to known clearly preventable risk factors, led by smoking, alcohol use and high BMI.

However, one 2015 study suggested that between ~70% and ~90% of cancers are due to environmental factors and therefore potentially preventable. Furthermore, it is estimated that with further research cancer death rates could be reduced by 70% around the world even without the development of any new therapies. Cancer prevention research receives only 2 to 9% of global cancer research funding, albeit many of the options for prevention are already well-known without further cancer-specific research but are not reflected in economics and policy. Mutational signatures of various cancers, for example, could reveal further causes of cancer and support causal attribution.

Detection

Prompt detection of cancer is important, since it is usually more difficult to treat in later stages.  Accurate detection of cancer is also important because false positives can cause harm from unnecessary medical procedures.  Some screening protocols are currently not accurate (such as prostate-specific antigen testing).  Others such as a colonoscopy or mammogram are unpleasant and as a result some patients may opt out.  Active research is underway to address all these problems, to develop novel ways of cancer screening and to increase detection rates.

For example:
 Multimodal learning AI systems are being developed to help detect many cancer types via integrating different types of data.
 Scientists work on identifying and measurability of novel biomarkers or sets of such to detect cancer early, such as tumor-associated mycobiomes and bacterial microbiomes
 Researchers investigate whether ants could be used as biosensors to detect cancer via urine

Treatment 

Emerging topics of cancer treatment research include:

Anti-cancer vaccines
Oncophage
Sipuleucel-T (Provenge) is a prostate cancer vaccine
Inactivated tumor cells are investigated as potential bifunctional cancer vaccines
 Newer forms of chemotherapy
Gene therapy
Photodynamic therapy
Radiation therapy
Reoviridae (Reolysin drug therapy)
Targeted therapy
Medical microbots (including bacterial), nanobots and bacterial 'cyborg cells'
 Virotherapy
 Antibodies
 Photoimmunotherapy (for brain cancer)
Natural killer cells can induce immunological memory. Research is being developed to modify their action against cancer.
How treatments can best be combined (in combination therapies)

Cause and development of cancer 

Research into the cause of cancer involves many different disciplines including genetics, diet, environmental factors (i.e. chemical carcinogens).  In regard to investigation of causes and potential targets for therapy, the route used starts with data obtained from clinical observations, enters basic research, and, once convincing and independently confirmed results are obtained, proceeds with clinical research, involving appropriately designed trials on consenting human subjects, with the aim to test safety and efficiency of the therapeutic intervention method.
An important part of basic research is characterization of the potential mechanisms of carcinogenesis, in regard to the types of genetic and epigenetic changes that are associated with cancer development. The mouse is often used as a mammalian model for manipulation of the function of genes that play a role in tumor formation, while basic aspects of tumor initiation, such as mutagenesis, are assayed on cultures of bacteria and mammalian cells.

Genes involved in cancer 

The goal of oncogenomics is to identify new oncogenes or tumor suppressor genes that may provide new insights into cancer diagnosis, predicting clinical outcome of cancers, and new targets for cancer therapies. As the Cancer Genome Project stated in a 2004 review article, "a central aim of cancer research has been to identify the mutated genes that are causally implicated in oncogenesis (cancer genes)." The Cancer Genome Atlas project is a related effort investigating the genomic changes associated with cancer, while the COSMIC cancer database documents acquired genetic mutations from hundreds of thousands of human cancer samples.

These large scale projects, involving about 350 different types of cancer, have identified ~130,000 mutations in ~3000 genes that have been mutated in the tumours. The majority occurred in 319 genes, of which 286 were tumour suppressor genes and 33 oncogenes.

Several hereditary factors can increase the chance of cancer-causing mutations, including the activation of oncogenes or the inhibition of tumor suppressor genes. The functions of various onco- and tumor suppressor genes can be disrupted at different stages of tumor progression. Mutations in such genes can be used to classify the malignancy of a tumor. 

In later stages, tumors can develop a resistance to cancer treatment. The identification of oncogenes and tumor suppressor genes is important to understand tumor progression and treatment success. The role of a given gene in cancer progression may vary tremendously, depending on the stage and type of cancer involved.

Cancer epigenetics

Cancer growth

Diet and cancer 

Periods of intermittent fasting (time-restricted feeding which may not include caloric restriction) is investigated for potential usefulness in cancer prevention and treatment and as of 2021 additional trials are needed to elucidate the risks and benefits. In some cases, "caloric restrictions could hinder both cancer growth and progression, besides enhancing the efficacy of chemotherapy and radiation therapy". Caloric restriction mimetics, including some present in foods like spermidine, are also investigated for these or similar reasons. Such and similar dietary supplements may contribute to prevention or treatment, with candidate substances including apigenin, berberine, jiaogulan, and rhodiola rosea.

Research funding 

Cancer research is funded by government grants, charitable foundations and pharmaceutical and biotechnology companies.

In the early 2000s, most funding for cancer research came from taxpayers and charities, rather than from corporations. In the US, less than 30% of all cancer research was funded by commercial researchers such as pharmaceutical companies. Per capita, public spending on cancer research by taxpayers and charities in the US was five times as much in 2002–03 as public spending by taxpayers and charities in the 15 countries that were full members of the European Union. As a percentage of GDP, the non-commercial funding of cancer research in the US was four times the amount dedicated to cancer research in Europe. Half of Europe's non-commercial cancer research is funded by charitable organizations.

The National Cancer Institute is the major funding institution in the United States. In the 2016 fiscal year, the NCI funded $5.2 billion in cancer research.

Difficulties 
Difficulties inherent to cancer research are shared with many types of biomedical research.

Cancer research processes have been criticised. These include, especially in the US, for the financial resources and positions required to conduct research. Other consequences of competition for research resources appear to be a substantial number of research publications whose results cannot be replicated.

Replicability

Public participation

Distributed computing
One can share computer time for distributed cancer research projects like Help Conquer Cancer. World Community Grid also had a project called Help Defeat Cancer. Other related projects include the Folding@home and Rosetta@home projects, which focus on groundbreaking protein folding and protein structure prediction research. Vodafone has also partnered with the Garvan Institute to create the DreamLab Project, which uses distributed computing via an app on cellphones to perform cancer research.

Clinical trials 

Members of the public can also join clinical trials as healthy control subjects or for methods of cancer detection.

There could be software and data-related procedures that increase participation in trials and make them faster and less expensive. One open source platform matches genomically profiled cancer patients to precision medicine drug trials.

Dominance of cancer research 
Cancer research has grown considerably as indicated by the number of records that have been indexed in the MEDLINE database, in the 1950s the proportion of cancer-related entries was approximately 6% of all entries and this has risen to 16% in 2016. This rise may be attributed to the impact of scientific advances such as genomics, computing and mathematics, which have had a stronger influence in cancer than in other areas such as cardiovascular conditions.

Organizations 

Organizations exist as associations for scientists participating in cancer research, such as the American Association for Cancer Research and American Society of Clinical Oncology, and as foundations for public awareness or raising funds for cancer research, such as Relay For Life and the American Cancer Society.

Awareness campaigns 
Supporters of different types of cancer have adopted different colored awareness ribbons and promote months of the year as being dedicated to the support of specific types of cancer. The American Cancer Society began promoting October as Breast Cancer Awareness Month in the United States in the 1980s. Pink products are sold to both generate awareness and raise money to be donated for research purposes. This has led to pinkwashing, or the selling of ordinary products turned pink as a promotion for the company.

See also 
 .cancerresearch
 Exposome

References

External links 
 Cancer Genome Anatomy Project @ The NIH
 The Integrative Cancer Biology Program @ National Cancer Institute

 
Cancer